The Baltimore Orioles are a Major League Baseball (MLB) franchise based in Baltimore, Maryland. They play in the American League East division. Since the institution of MLB's Rule 4 Draft, the Orioles have selected 60 players in the first round. Officially known as the "First-Year Player Draft", the Rule 4 Draft is MLB's primary mechanism for assigning amateur baseball players from high schools, colleges, and other amateur baseball clubs to its teams. The draft order is determined based on the previous season's standings, with the team possessing the worst record receiving the first pick. In addition, teams which lost free agents in the previous off-season may be awarded compensatory or supplementary picks.

Of the 60 players picked in the first round by Baltimore, 30 have been pitchers, the most of any position; 21 of them were right-handed, while 9 were left-handed. Twelve outfielders, eight shortstops, seven catchers, two third basemen, and one second basemen were also taken. The team has never drafted a player at first base. 16 of the players came from high schools or universities in the state of California, and Florida follows with five players. The Orioles have also drafted two players from Canada, Ntema Ndungidi (1997) and Adam Loewen (2002). The Orioles have not drafted any players from their home state of Maryland.

Two players have won a championship with the team; Bobby Grich (1967), who was a part of the 1970 World Series championship team, and Rich Dauer (1974), who was a part of the 1983 World Series championship team. Mike Mussina (1990) is the only of the Orioles' first-round picks to have been elected to the Baseball Hall of Fame. One pick, Gregg Olson (1988), has won the MLB Rookie of the Year Award; he won the award in 1989. The Orioles had the first overall selection three times in the draft, which they used on Ben McDonald (1989), Adley Rutschman (2019), and Jackson Holliday (2022). Jayson Werth (1997) was originally drafted as a catcher, but was converted to a right fielder, and primarily plays that position in the major leagues.

The Orioles have made 11 selections in the supplemental round of the draft and six compensatory picks since the institution of the First-Year Player Draft in 1965. These additional picks are provided when a team loses a particularly valuable free agent in the previous off-season, or, more recently, if a team fails to sign a draft pick from the previous year. The Orioles have failed to sign two of their first-round picks, Brad DuVall (1987) and Wade Townsend (2004). They received the 28th pick in 1988 and the 48th pick in 2005 for failing to sign DuVall and Townsend, respectively, as compensation.

Key

Picks

See also
Baltimore Orioles minor league players

Footnotes
 Through the 2012 draft, free agents were evaluated by the Elias Sports Bureau and rated "Type A", "Type B", or not compensation-eligible. If a team offered arbitration to a player but that player refused and subsequently signed with another team, the original team was able to receive additional draft picks. If a "Type A" free agent left in this way, his previous team received a supplemental pick and a compensatory pick from the team with which he signed. If a "Type B" free agent left in this way, his previous team received only a supplemental pick. Since the 2013 draft, free agents are no longer classified by type; instead, compensatory picks are only awarded if the team offered its free agent a contract worth at least the average of the 125 current richest MLB contracts. However, if the free agent's last team acquired the player in a trade during the last year of his contract, it is ineligible to receive compensatory picks for that player.
 The Orioles lost their first-round pick in 1979 to the Chicago White Sox as compensation for signing free agent Steve Stone.
 The Orioles lost their first-round pick in 1981 to the Boston Red Sox as compensation for signing free agent Jim Dwyer.
 The Orioles lost their first-round pick in 1985 to the California Angels as compensation for signing free agent Fred Lynn.
 The Orioles lost their first-round pick in 1986 to the California Angels as compensation for signing free agent Juan Beníquez.
 The Orioles gained a compensatory first-round pick in 1987 from the Cleveland Indians for losing free agent Rick Dempsey.
 The Orioles gained a supplemental first-round pick in 1987 for losing free agent Rick Dempsey.
 The Orioles gained a supplemental first-round pick in 1988 for failing to sign draft pick Brad DuVall.
 The Orioles lost their first-round pick in 1994 to the New York Mets as compensation for signing free agent Sid Fernandez.
 The Orioles lost their first-round pick in 1996 to the Toronto Blue Jays as compensation for signing free agent Roberto Alomar.
 The Orioles gained a compensatory first-round pick in 1997 from the New York Yankees for losing free agent David Wells.
 The Orioles gained a supplemental first-round pick in 1997 for losing free agent David Wells.
 The Orioles gained a supplemental first-round pick in 1998 for losing free agent Randy Myers.
 The Orioles gained a compensatory first-round pick in 1999 from the St. Louis Cardinals for losing free agent Eric Davis.
 The Orioles gained a compensatory first-round pick in 1999 from the Texas Rangers for losing free agent Rafael Palmeiro.
 The Orioles gained a compensatory first-round pick in 1999 from the Cleveland Indians for losing free agent Roberto Alomar.
 The Orioles gained a supplemental first-round pick in 1999 for losing free agent Roberto Alomar.
 The Orioles gained a supplemental first-round pick in 1999 for losing free agent Eric Davis.
 The Orioles gained a supplemental first-round pick in 1999 for losing free agent Rafael Palmeiro.
 The Orioles gained a supplemental first-round pick in 2000 for losing free agent Arthur Rhodes.
 The Orioles gained a compensatory first-round pick in 2001 from the New York Yankees for losing free agent Mike Mussina.
 The Orioles gained a supplemental first-round pick in 2001 for losing free agent Mike Mussina.
 The Orioles gained a supplemental first-round pick in 2005 for failing to sign draft pick Wade Townsend.
 The Orioles gained a supplemental first-round pick in 2006 for losing free agent B. J. Ryan.

References
General references

In-text citations

External links
Baltimore Orioles official website

First-round
Baltimore Orioles